Paradox is a Thai rock band founded in 1996 while they were studying in Faculty of Education, Chulalongkorn University. They are famous as a unique live band in Thailand.

Members 
Ittipong Kridakorn Na Ayudhaya (อิทธิพงศ์ กฤดากร ณ อยุธยา) (Tar) Vocal/Guitarist
Chakrapong Siririn  (จักรพงษ์ สิริริน) (Song) Bassist
Kajadphai Karnchanapar (ขจัดภัย กาญจนาภา) (Big) Guitarist
Saittaporn Kridakorn Na Ayadhaya (เสรฐพร กฤดากร ณ อยุธยา) (Joey) Drummer
Charnnarong Wangyen (ชาญณรงค์ วังเย็น) (Off) Screamer
Nattha Kamolrattanakul (นัทธา กมลรัตนกุล) (Keng) Joker

Past member 
Porapat Cheeweewat (พรภัฏ ชีวีวัฒน์) (Note) Drummer

History

Former Period 

In computer class, Ittipong Kridakorn Na Ayudhaya or Ta (อิทธิพงศ์ กฤดากร ณ อยุธยา), a student from Faculty of Education, Chulalongkorn University, who wanted to join university activities as a freshy by having band asked Chakrapong Siririn (จักรพงษ์ สิริริน) or Song, from the same faculty, to join him as a bassist. Both were influenced by Modern Dog, one of the leading Thai alternative bands at the time. They attended a Modern Dog concert held at the Faculty of Communication arts and met the band's first drummer Porapat Cheeweewat (พรภัฏ ชีวีวัฒน์) or Note.

Initially, they used "หอยจ๊อ" Hoy Jor as their band name and sent their demo to Easternsky Records, an independent record label. In only one day, their demo was accepted on condition that they change their band for commercial purposes -Paradox-

Lunatic Planet 

With their unique musical sound, their first album "Lunatic Planet", which was released in 1996, became so famous among indie music listeners. At that time, Note had introduced Kajadphai Karnchanapar (ขจัดภัย กาญจนาภา), also known as Big, to become another member as a guitarist.

After Easternsky Records had closed down, Note had moved to USA after his marriage and work, Paradox eventually went on hiatus for a year. They recorded their first indie album, แมลงวันสเปน Ma Leang Wan Spain (Spanish Fly), in limited 1,000 cassettes sold in the university using Tata Records, founded by Ta, as a record label. Paradox & My Friends, another indie album which included other associated bands' works on the cassette's B-side. All the recorded works from the indie albums were recorded in Ta's bedroom.

Another Big Step 
Pretty soon, they had another chance to work for the "ท่ามกลาง" Tam Glang (Among)  project "Intro 2000", a various artists album from Genie Records which is a branch of GMM Grammy, the largest record label and entertainment company in Thailand. They were asked to sign with Genie Records afterwards.

Since they did not have enough members to perform in the band, Ta had invited Saittaporn Kridakorn Na Ayadhaya (เสรฐพร กฤดากร ณ อยุธยา) or Joey, his relative who was also their temporary drummer, to officially become their full-time drummer. Ta had also invited Charnnarong Wangyen (ชาญณรงค์ วังเย็น) (Off) to be a screamer and the last one  Nattha Kamolrattanakul (นัทธา กมลรัตนกุล) or Keng to be a Joker, both of whom would become regular entertainers in live performances by Paradox.

Summer 
During 2000, their 2nd album, titled "Summer", was released. Paradox became famous by their unique style of music, an example being their song น้องเปิ้ล Nong Ple. Their debut song, ร.ด. Dance Ror Dor Dance (Military Dance) or ฤดูร้อน Ru Du Ron (Summer) would be big hits for the band.

Paradox decided to break away from the indie world by releasing " แค้นผีนรก Khean Phee Na Rok (Hell Ghost Revenge) in 2000, after Summer had been released.

Following their success with "Summer", "On The Beach", a special album was released. This album contained acoustic versions of the songs from both Lunatic Planet and Summer and 2 new special tracks, ดาว Dao (Stars) สงสัย Song Sai (Curiosity), which also became one of their famous hit songs, especially ดาว Dao (Stars) which had been covered by many artists from time to time.

Two years later, their 3rd album, "On The Rainbow", was released. This marked a change in Paradox's style as the band used a softer sound and more beautiful melodies, seen in songs such as รุ้ง Rung (Rainbow) and เศษ Set (Pieces), a power ballad, or ไฟ Fai (Fire), a fast-paced song.  Unfortunately, this album did not garner as much success as the previous album "Summer".

First Concert 

Paradox had become one of the leading rock bands in Thailand, hosting their own first concert in 2003 by Fat Radio named Fat Live 4 : The Paradox Circus, the official full name of the concert. This concert was held at the Indoor Stadium Huamark on 26 March 2003. They also used this concert to promote their next album named "Free Style" by performing the first promotional single from this album "Sexy".

Their 4th album Free Style also included a reworked version of นักมายากล Nak Ma Ya Kol (The Magician), one of the hit songs from their 1st album Lunatic Planet.

In that same year, Paradox joined the Little Rock Project, a special music project with other bands from the same record label, for instance Clash, ABNormal, Kala, to cover songs from Micro, a legendary Thai rock band, in "Rock Size S Concert in Freedom Sunday" at Impact Arena Mueang Thong Thani.

Discography

Albums

Studio albums 
 1996 : Lunatic Planet
 2000 : Summer
 2002 : On The Rainbow
 2003 : Free Style
 2006 : X (Ten Years After)
 2011 : Daydreamer
 2017 : Before Sunrise After Sunset

Independent albums 
 1997 : แมลงวันสเปน Ma Leang Wan Spain(Spanish Fly)
 1998 : PARADOX & My Friends
 2000 : แค้นผีนรก Khean Phee Na Rok (Hell Ghost Revenge)

Live album 
 2003 : Fat Live 4 : The Paradox Circus

Compilation 
 2004 : Hit Me

Special albums 
 2001 : On The Beach
 2007 : Paradox In Paradise

Home videos 
 2003 : Pattaya Music Festival2003 Vol. 4
 2003 : Fat Live 4 : The Paradox Circus
 2004 : Rock Size S Concert in Freedom Sunday

Books 
 2007 : บันทึกลึกลับ Paradox X Ban Teuk Leuk Lab Paradox X(Mystery Note of Paradox X)

Awards 
 2004 Best Hit Music of the year, FAT AWARD#2 - ขอ Khor from Free Style
 2004 Best Hook of the year, FAT AWARD#2 - ขอ Khor from Free Style
 2007 Best Artist of the year, FAT AWARD#5

References

External links 
 Tatamag.com – PARADOX Official Website (archived)
 Myspace.com/paradoxspace – Paradox MySpace
 PARADOX FOREVER – Paradox Fansite (Thai Only)
 PARADOX FANSITE – PARADOX interview (Thai Only)
 R I S H A D A N P O R T Lyrics and Guitar chords (Thai Only)
 Interview On The Rainbow (Thai Only)
 Manager Online "Ta" 10 years rollback with "Indies" standpoint! (Thai Only)
 Manager Weekly"PARADOX" Revelation : Touch the rear of music.(Thai Only)

Thai rock music groups
Musical groups established in 1996
Musical groups from Bangkok